Seaton is an unincorporated community in Bell County, Texas, with an estimated population of 60 as of 2000. It is located within the Killeen-Temple-Fort Hood metropolitan area.

History
The community was first recognized when Czech families settled in the area in 1881. It had a store and a saloon when the town applied for a post office in 1891. It was given the name Seaton, which accordingly was not named after any settlers. 17 people were living in Seaton in 1896 and had a cotton gin as well. A Czech Brethren church was established in 1906. The post office closed in 1907. The population reached 55 in about 1933 with three businesses and peaked at 80 right before 1950 with a church, five businesses, and a community park. All businesses closed by the 1960s. The population went down to 60 in 2000.

Geography

Education
In 1903, Seaton had a school with 55 students and one teacher. Today, the community is served by the Rogers Independent School District.

References

Unincorporated communities in Texas
Unincorporated communities in Bell County, Texas
Populated places established in 1881
1881 establishments in Texas